Kenneth Edwin Westman (2 February 1907 - 30 July 1964) was a British diplomat and intelligence officer.

Early life and education 
Westman was born in Glamorgan, Wales to James Westman and Beatrice Branch. He was educated at Cowbridge Grammar School.

Career 
Westman joined HM Diplomatic Service in 1929. He was involved in British covert operations in Latin America, particularly Bolivia. Westman helped to strengthen British involvement in the region. He acted on behalf of the Foreign Office. Some of the files on his activities remain secret. During the Second World War Westman served as an intelligence officer with the Secret Intelligence Service and SOE.

He also worked as a genealogist.

Family 
Kenneth Edwin Westman married Jean Felicia Bedworth, daughter of Bertram James Davenport Bedworth and Edith Emily Dixon. They had issue:

 Roger Ulick Branch Westman (1939-2020), architect
 Nicholas Westman (b. 1943), engineer
 Kenneth Andrew Rodney Westman (b. 1948), archaeologist

References 

1907 births
1964 deaths
People educated at Winchester College
British diplomats
People from Glamorgan
British intelligence operatives
Intelligence Corps officers
British genealogists